Ardalan Ashtiani (born April 5, 1982) is an Iranian football player. He is the son of Iranian footballer Ebrahim Ashtiani.

References

External links 
Ardalan Ahtiani's Picture, Khanevadeye Sabz Magazine

Iranian footballers
Persepolis F.C. players
Living people
1982 births
Homa F.C. players
Association football fullbacks